Plays Pretty for Baby is the second album by the American punk rock band Nation of Ulysses.

"The Sound of Jazz to Come" and "50,000 Watts of Goodwill" reference the opening track of A Love Supreme by John Coltrane in their respective openings, while the former references the similarly titled Ornette Coleman album, The Shape of Jazz to Come.

The album's first track begins with a live reading from Thus Spoke Zarathustra:

To you the bold and foolish lambs. To you who are intoxicated with riddles, let's go. Who take pleasure in twilight. Whose souls are lured by noise to every treacherous abyss. For you do not feel for a rope like cowards, and where you can guess you hate to calculate. And where others would poison, you dismember.

Track listing
"N-Sub Ulysses" − 3:32
"A Comment on Ritual" − 2:27
"The Hickey Underworld" − 2:50
"Perpetual Motion Machine" − 2:33
"N.O.U. Future Vision Hypothesis" − 3:09
"50,000 Watts of Goodwill" − 4:05
"Maniac Dragstrip" − 2:59
"Last Train to Cool" − 3:27
"Shakedown" − 3:27
"Mockingbird, Yeah!" − 2:59
"Depression III" − 3:27
"S.S. Exploder" − 2:27
"The Kingdom of Heaven Must Be Taken by Storm" − 2:12
"The Sound of Jazz to Come" − 4:42
"N.O.U.S.P.T.D.A." − 2:51
"Presidents of Vice" − 2:35

Tracks 14–16 on the CD are not on the original album, and are taken from the 7-inch EP Birth of the Ulysses Aesthetic.

Personnel
Nation of Ulysses
 James Canty - "The Exploder" (drums)
 Steve Gamboa - "The Grumbler and sometimes the Mumbler" (bass)
 Tim Green - "The Squealer and the Crackler" (guitar)
 Steve Kroner - "The Scraper and the Howler" (guitar)
 Ian Svenonius - "The Sobber, the Roarer, the Hisser, and the Whisperer" (vocals, trumpet)

Background vocals, credited as the "Doo-Wop Assembly"
 Brendan Canty
 Guy Picciotto
 Alec MacKaye
 Billy Karren
 Kathi Wilcox
 Kathleen Hanna
 Tobi Vail

 Production
 Ian MacKaye - producer
 Don Zientara - engineering

References

1992 albums
Dischord Records albums
The Nation of Ulysses albums